Moses Samuel was a clockmaker, translator of Hebrew works and writer.

Life
His parents were Emanuel Menachem Samuel and Hanna Hinde; his father moved from Kempen in Posen in Silesia (now Kępno in Poland) to London. Moses with his mother moved to Liverpool around 1805. He went into business, not with any great success, but founding what later became the H. Samuel chain. His older brother Louis (1794–1859) was the father of Samuel Montagu, 1st Baron Swaythling and grandfather of Sir Stuart Montagu Samuel, 1st Baronet and Herbert Samuel, 1st Viscount Samuel.

Works

He was the originally anonymous translator of the Italian Jewish kabbalah text Book of Jasher (Venice, 1625) which later became a para-canonical text in the Church of Jesus Christ of Latter-day Saints. He later wrote "I did not put my name to it as my Patron and myself differed about its authenticity". The patron was Mordecai Noah, the New York publisher, who purchased the text after the Royal Asiatic Society declined it.

He also translated works of Moses Mendelssohn (notably Jerusalem, London, 1838) into English. An orthodox Jew, he campaigned against both the Reform Jewish movement, and as author of An Address to the Missionaries of Great Britain against Christian efforts to proselytise Jews. He co-edited The Cup of Salvation - Kos Yeshuot, a magazine in Hebrew and English, with D. M. Isaacs.

References

External links
Jewish Encyclopedia "...Samuel was a zealous advocate of the emancipation of his coreligionists, and a rebuke, entitled "The Jew and the Barrister," he administered to a member of the bar was favorably noticed in several magazines."
 

1795 births
1860 deaths
Translators from Hebrew
English clockmakers
English Jews
Writers from Liverpool
19th-century translators